U.S. Route 70 Bypass (US 70 Byp.) is a bypass route of US 70 in North Carolina that runs west of Goldsboro to La Grange. Formerly known as North Carolina Highway 44 (NC 44) from 2011 to 2016, its current designation is also only temporary as it will become part of Interstate 42 (I-42).

Route description
Starting west of Goldsboro, it splits as the through traffic from US 70, which continues on towards Goldsboro. In a northeasterly direction, it connects with NC 581, I-795 and US 117, where it turns southeasterly. After connecting with Wayne Memorial Drive, US 13, and Parkstown Road, it merges back as the through traffic with US 70 near La Grange. Mile markers along the route are based on US 70 and the speed limit is  throughout.

The bypass serves both as a strategic transportation corridor for North Carolina and part of the Strategic Highway Network (STRAHNET).

History

Construction started on the  central section of the Goldsboro Bypass on October 9, 2008; its contract awarded to Barnhill Contracting Co. of Tarboro. At a cost of $65.5 million (equivalent to $ in ), it features three interchanges connecting I-795, US 117 and Wayne Memorial Drive (SR 1556). On December 16, 2011, the central section became the first segment of the Goldsboro Bypass to open; signed as NC 44.

In 2012, both eastern and western sections of the bypass began construction. The  eastern section's contract was awarded to Barnhill Contracting Co. in February, at a cost of $104.4 million (equivalent to $ in ). The  western section's contract was awarded to S.T. Wooten in July, at a cost of $62.4 million (equivalent to $ in ). On September 25, 2015, the American Association of State Highway and Transportation Officials (AASHTO) approved the establishment of US 70 Byp., dependent on the completion of the Goldsboro Bypass. On October 17, 2015, the western section became the second segment to open; connecting US 70 and I-795, with an interchange at NC 581.

The eastern or last section of the Goldsboro Bypass was opened on May 27, 2016; from Wayne Memorial Drive (SR 1556) to US 70, with interchanges at US 13 and Parkstown Road (SR 1714). The section opened with a ribbon cutting ceremony and all signage that formally delineate NC 44 would be changed to US 70 Byp. after the event.

On June 5, 2021 a  section was dedicated to former Goldsboro Mayor Chuck Allen.

North Carolina Highway 44

The first NC 44 appeared in 1930 as a new primary routing between US 17-1/NC 40, in Whitakers, and NC 90, in Tarboro. In 1935, NC 44 was extended east through Tarboro, along US 64, to Princeville, then on new primary routing to NC 125, in Oak City. In 1941, NC 44 was extended west, along new primary routing, to NC 48. In 1967, NC 44 was removed from a  concurrency with NC 11 to NC 125, in Oak City. By 1968, NC 44 was rerouted onto new western bypass of Tarboro, in currency with US 64; its former routing became US 64 Business. In 1994, NC 44 was decommissioned in favor of NC 33, between NC 48 and Tarboro, and NC 111, between Princeville and Oak City.

The second NC 44 was signed as a placeholder along the Goldsboro Bypass during its construction until it was completed. On May 27, 2016, the  Goldsboro Bypass was completed and NC 44 decommissioned in favor of US 70 Byp.

Interstate designation
In March, 2022 the Federal Highway Administration designated the 10-mile Clayton Bypass and the 22-mile Goldsboro Bypass, which have been built to interstate standards, as Interstate 42.  Signs were not immediately put up.  Eventually, Interstate 42  will run from I-40 in Raleigh to Morehead City. The FHA and AASHTO conditionally allowed the designation of U.S. 70 as Future I-42.

Exit list

See also

References

External links

NCRoads.com: N.C. 44

Bypass (Goldsboro, North Carolina)
Transportation in Wayne County, North Carolina
Transportation in Lenoir County, North Carolina
70 Bypass (Goldsboro, North Carolina)
70 Bypass (Goldsboro)
Goldsboro, North Carolina